17th Ohio Battery was an artillery battery that served in the Union Army during the American Civil War.

Service
The 17th Ohio Battery was organized in Dayton, Ohio, and mustered in August 21, 1862, for a three-year enlistment under Captain Ambrose A. Blount.

The battery was attached to Artillery, 1st Division, Army of Kentucky, Department of the Ohio, to October 1862. Unattached, Army of Kentucky, Department of the Ohio, Lexington, Kentucky, to November 1862. Artillery, 10th Division, XIII Corps, Department of the Tennessee, to December 1862. Artillery, 1st Division, Sherman's Yazoo Expedition, to January 1863. Artillery, 10th Division, XIII Corps, Army of the Tennessee, to August 1863. 2nd Brigade, 4th Division, XIII Corps, Department of the Gulf, to June 1864. Defenses of New Orleans, Louisiana, to August 1864. United States Forces, Mobile Bay, Department of the Gulf, to September 1864. Unattached Artillery, XIX Corps, Department of the Gulf, to December 1864. Unattached, Artillery Reserve Corps, Military Division West Mississippi, to February 1865. Artillery Brigade, XVI Corps, Military Division West Mississippi, to July 1865.

The 17th Ohio Battery mustered out of service on August 16, 1865.

Detailed service
Ordered to Covington, Ky., September 3. Duty at Covington, Ky., during threatened attack on Cincinnati by Edmund Kirby Smith. March to Lexington, Ky., then to Louisville, Ky., and duty there until December 1. Ordered to Memphis, Tenn., December 1. Sherman's Yazoo Expedition December 20, 1862, to January 3, 1863. Expedition from Milliken's Bend to Dallas Station and Delhi December 25–26. Chickasaw Bayou December 26–28. Chickasaw Bluff December 29. Expedition to Arkansas Post, Ark., January 3–10, 1863. Assault on and capture of Fort Hindman, Arkansas Post, January 10–11. Moved to Young's Point, La., January 15. Expedition to Greenville, Miss., and Cypress Bend, Ark., February 14–26. Action at Cypress Bend February 19. Moved to Milliken's Bend March 8. Movement on Bruinsburg, Mississippi, and turning Grand Gulf April 25–30. Battle of Port Gibson May 1. Battle of Champion Hill May 16. Siege of Vicksburg, Miss., May 18-July 4. Assaults on Vicksburg May 19 and 22. Advance on Jackson July 5–10. Siege of Jackson, Miss., July 10–17. Assault on Jackson July 12. Duty at Vicksburg until August 20. Ordered to New Orleans, La., and duty there until September 5. At Brashear City until October 3. Expedition to New and Amite Rivers September 24–29. Western Louisiana ("Teche") Campaign October 3-November 30. Grand Coteau November 3. Moved to New Orleans, La., and duty there until August 1864. Operations in Mobile Bay against Forts Gaines and Morgan August 2–23. Siege and capture of Fort Gaines August 3–8. Siege and capture of Fort Morgan August 10–23. Duty at New Orleans until March 1865. Campaign against Mobile, Ala., and its defenses March 17-April 12. Siege of Spanish Fort and Fort Blakely March 26-April 8. Assault and capture of Fort Blakely April 9. Occupation of Mobile April 12. March to Montgomery April 13–25. Duty at Montgomery and Selma, Ala., until July. Ordered home for muster out.

Casualties
The battery lost a total of 44 men during service; 1 enlisted man killed, 1 officer and 42 enlisted men died due to disease.

Commanders
 Captain Ambrose A. Blount
 Captain Charles S. Rice

See also

 List of Ohio Civil War units
 Ohio in the Civil War

References
 Dyer, Frederick H.  A Compendium of the War of the Rebellion (Des Moines, IA:  Dyer Pub. Co.), 1908.
 Mattox, Absalom Heiskell. "What did we fight for?" (Cincinnati, OH:  R. Clarke & Co.), 1885.  ["A response by A. H. Mattox, late first lieutenant, 17th Ohio Veteran Volunteer Battery of Light Artillery, at the second annual reunion of the battery, at Springfield, Ohio, August 5th, 1886."]
 Ohio Roster Commission. Official Roster of the Soldiers of the State of Ohio in the War on the Rebellion, 1861–1865, Compiled Under the Direction of the Roster Commission (Akron, OH: Werner Co.), 1886–1895.
 Reid, Whitelaw. Ohio in the War: Her Statesmen, Her Generals, and Soldiers (Cincinnati, OH: Moore, Wilstach, & Baldwin), 1868. 
Attribution

External links
 Ohio in the Civil War: 17th Ohio Battery by Larry Stevens
 17th Ohio Battery monument at Vicksburg

Military units and formations established in 1862
Military units and formations disestablished in 1865
Units and formations of the Union Army from Ohio
Artillery units and formations of the American Civil War
1862 establishments in Ohio